A number of real-life inspirations have been suggested for James Bond, the fictional character created in 1953 by British author, journalist and Naval Intelligence officer Ian Fleming (1908 – 1964); Bond appeared in twelve novels and nine short stories by Fleming, as well as a number of continuation novels and twenty-six films, with seven actors playing the role of Bond.

Although the stories and characters were fictional, a number of elements had a real-life background, taken from people whom Fleming knew or events he was aware of. These included the spy's name, which Fleming took from the American ornithologist James Bond, and the code number—007—which referred to the breaking of a World War I German diplomatic code. Some aspects of Bond's character and tastes replicate those of Fleming himself.

An inspiration for the James Bond spy novels may have come from the writings of William Le Queux, who wrote related novels between 1891 and 1931;. As well, inspiration for the James Bond films, on the other hand, may have come from the early silent films of German director Fritz Lang, including the 1922 film Dr. Mabuse the Gambler, and the 1928 film Spione.

Origins of the name

On the morning of 17 February 1952, Ian Fleming started writing what would become his first book, Casino Royale, at his Goldeneye estate in Jamaica. He typed out 2,000 words in the morning, directly from his own experiences and imagination and finished work on the manuscript in just over a month, completing it on 18 March 1952. Fleming took the name for his character from that of the American ornithologist James Bond, a Caribbean bird expert and author of the definitive field guide Birds of the West Indies; Fleming, a keen birdwatcher himself, had a copy of Bond's guide and he later explained to the ornithologist's wife that "It struck me that this brief, unromantic, Anglo-Saxon and yet very masculine name was just what I needed, and so a second James Bond was born".

On another occasion Fleming said: "I wanted the simplest, dullest, plainest-sounding name I could find, 'James Bond' was much better than something more interesting, like 'Peregrine Carruthers'. Exotic things would happen to and around him, but he would be a neutral figure—an anonymous, blunt instrument wielded by a government department." After Fleming met the ornithologist and his wife, he described them as "a charming couple who are amused by the whole joke". The ornithologist was obliquely referred to in the film Die Another Day with Pierce Brosnan's Bond picking up a copy of Birds of the West Indies and posing as an ornithologist.

Character inspirations

Dominican playboy, diplomat, soldier, polo player and race car driver "Porfirio Rubirosa" was the main influence for the character according to lawyer and historian "Daniel J. Voelker".
Rubirosa was a man who made his mark for his international lifestyle, jetsetting and massive success with women; out of his five spouses, two of them were the richest women in the world at that time. Voelker wrote that Fleming refrained from publicizing his muse for fear that racism would harm the sale of the book - Rubirosa was from mixed racial background and Fleming's audience in the 1950s and early 60s may not have been accepting of such revelation. He also wrote that out of all the rumoured inspirations for the character, only Rubirosa checks all the boxes, claiming the similarities between the two are uncanny, he brought comparisons between Fleming's and Rubirosa's lives, interests, lovers, admirers and circle of friends over a 30 year old period and all of them seem to coincide.

In other interview, Voelker stated that:
"Two of the main focal points can be found through internationally famous celebrities Errol Flynn and Noel Coward. Friends with both Fleming and Rubirosa, these two lived between Fleming and Rubirosa in the Caribbean, traveled and partied with both of them and even shared a ‘love connection’ through certain well known women, including Rita Hayworth and Eva Perón." which can lead to another proof that character was inspired by the controversial man.

During the Second World War Fleming was the personal assistant to the director of the Naval Intelligence Division, Admiral John Godfrey. He reached the rank of commander—a rank he subsequently gave to his fictional creation—and was the planner for special operations unit 30th Assault Unit. Many of Bond's tastes and traits were Fleming's own, including sharing the same golf handicap, the taste for scrambled eggs and using the same brand of toiletries. Bond's tastes are also often taken from Fleming's, as was his behaviour, with Bond's love of golf and gambling mirroring his creator's. Fleming used the experiences of his espionage career and other aspects of his life as inspiration when writing, including using names of school friends, acquaintances, relatives and lovers throughout his books.

Bond's cigarettes were also the same as Fleming's, who had been buying his custom-made by Morland since the 1930s; Fleming added the three gold bands on the filter during the war to mirror his naval Commander's rank. On average, Bond smokes sixty cigarettes a day, although he cut back to around twenty-five a day after his visit to a health farm in Thunderball. Fleming himself smoked up to eighty cigarettes a day. Apart from imbuing Bond with his own tastes, Fleming based his fictional creation on a number of individuals he came across during his time in intelligence, admitting that Bond "was a compound of all the secret agents and commando types I met during the war".

The Institute of National Remembrance revealed in 2020 that James Albert Bond (1928 – 2005), a British diplomat born in Bideford, Devon, had worked at the British Embassy in Warsaw with arrival of Warsaw on 18 February 1964 and left the territory of the Polish People's Republic on 21 January 1965. Released documents confirm that he conducted espionage activities. It is unclear whether Ian Fleming was aware of the existence of an actual spy named James Albert Bond. James Albert Bond had a son with his wife Janette Tacchi who is also called James, born in 1955.

Literary Inspirations
Besides real life individuals, James Bond was also inspired by one of Dennis Wheatley's characters; the secret agent Gregory Sallust,  based on Wheatley's late friend Gordon Eric Gordon-Tombe. It is also said that the character of James Bond took inspiration from a collection of short stories about a gentlemanly and sophisticated spy by Somerset Maugham, using his own spying experience as a basis. 

Another inspiration for the James Bond spy novels may have come from the writings of William Le Queux, who wrote related novels between 1891 and 1931; inspiration for the James Bond spy films, on the other hand, may have come from the early silent films of German director Fritz Lang, including the 1922 film Dr. Mabuse the Gambler, and the 1928 film Spione. Somewhat related, Gert Fröbe, who played the chief prosecutor investigating Dr. Mabuse in the more recent German spy films, The Thousand Eyes of Dr. Mabuse (1960), The Return of Doctor Mabuse (1961) and The Testament of Dr. Mabuse (1962), later played the role of Auric Goldfinger in the 1964 James Bond spy film Goldfinger.

Inspiration for "007"
The 007 number assigned to James Bond may have been influenced by any number of sources. In the films and novels, the 00 prefix indicates Bond's discretionary "licence to kill", in executing his duties. Bond's number—007—was assigned by Fleming in reference to one of British naval intelligence's key achievements of World War I: the breaking of the German diplomatic code.

One of the German documents cracked and read by the British was the Zimmermann Telegram, which was coded 0075, and which was one of the factors that led to the US entering the war. Subsequently, if material was graded 00 it meant it was highly classified and, as journalist Ben Macintyre has pointed out, "to anyone versed in intelligence history, 007 signified the highest achievement of British military intelligence."

John Dee, who was accused of spying for the crown, signed his letters to Elizabeth I, Queen of England between 1558 and 1603, with a "007" symbol, marking them thereby as personal – destined for her majesty's eyes only.

See also
 Outline of James Bond

References

Sources

External links
 Official website of Ian Fleming Publications

James Bond
James Bond lists
Bond, James